This is a list of 217 species in Trichadenotecnum, a genus of common barklice in the family Psocidae.

Trichadenotecnum species

 Trichadenotecnum aconcinnum Yoshizawa, Garcia Aldrete & Mockford, 2008 c g
 Trichadenotecnum acutolingum Yoshizawa, Garcia Aldrete & Mockford, 2008 c g
 Trichadenotecnum acutum Yoshizawa, Garcia Aldrete & Mockford, 2008 c g
 Trichadenotecnum adika Endang, Thornton & New, 2002 c g
 Trichadenotecnum aduncatum Li, Fasheng, 2002 c g
 Trichadenotecnum aggrogatum Li, Fasheng, 2001 c g
 Trichadenotecnum album Yoshizawa, 2001 c g
 Trichadenotecnum alexanderae Sommerman, 1948 i c g b
 Trichadenotecnum alinguum Endang, Thornton & New, 2002 c g
 Trichadenotecnum alobum Endang & New, 2005 c g
 Trichadenotecnum alternatum Li, Fasheng, 2002 c g
 Trichadenotecnum amamiense Yoshizawa, 2001 c g
 Trichadenotecnum ampullaceum Li, Fasheng, 2002 c g
 Trichadenotecnum angolense Badonnel, 1955 c g
 Trichadenotecnum anomalum Yoshizawa & Lienhard, 2014 c g
 Trichadenotecnum apertum Thornton, 1961 c g
 Trichadenotecnum arciforme Thornton, 1961 c g
 Trichadenotecnum auritum Yoshizawa & Lienhard, 2004 c g
 Trichadenotecnum baishanzuicum Li, Fasheng, 1995 c g
 Trichadenotecnum bannaense Li, Fasheng, 2002 c g
 Trichadenotecnum barrerai Yoshizawa, Garcia Aldrete & Mockford, 2008 c g
 Trichadenotecnum bicolor Li, Fasheng, 2001 c g
 Trichadenotecnum bidens Thornton, 1961 c g
 Trichadenotecnum bidentatum Thornton, 1984 c g
 Trichadenotecnum bigyrans Li, Fasheng, 2001 c g
 Trichadenotecnum bitenatum (Li, Fasheng, 1995) c
 Trichadenotecnum bos Yoshizawa, Garcia Aldrete & Mockford, 2008 c g
 Trichadenotecnum brevicornum Yoshizawa, Garcia Aldrete & Mockford, 2008 c g
 Trichadenotecnum bromoense Endang, Thornton & New, 2002 c g
 Trichadenotecnum bucciniforme Li, Fasheng, 1993 c g
 Trichadenotecnum calycoideum Li, Fasheng, 2002 c g
 Trichadenotecnum carinatum Yoshizawa, Garcia Aldrete & Mockford, 2008 c g
 Trichadenotecnum castum Betz, 1983 i c g b 
 Trichadenotecnum cerrosillae Yoshizawa, Garcia Aldrete & Mockford, 2008 c g
 Trichadenotecnum cheahae Endang, Thornton & New, 2002 c g
 Trichadenotecnum chiapense Yoshizawa, Garcia Aldrete & Mockford, 2008 c g
 Trichadenotecnum chinense Li, Fasheng, 1997 c g
 Trichadenotecnum cinnamonum Endang & New, 2005 c g
 Trichadenotecnum cintalapense Yoshizawa, Garcia Aldrete & Mockford, 2008 c g
 Trichadenotecnum circulare (Hagen, 1859) c g
 Trichadenotecnum circularoides Badonnel, 1955 i c g b
 Trichadenotecnum colesae Turner, B. D. & Cheke, 1983 c g
 Trichadenotecnum concinnum Yoshizawa, Garcia Aldrete & Mockford, 2008 c g
 Trichadenotecnum corniculum Yoshizawa, 2003 c g
 Trichadenotecnum cornutum Endang & New, 2005 c g
 Trichadenotecnum corollatum (Li, Fasheng, 2002) c g
 Trichadenotecnum cynostigmus (Li, Fasheng, 2002) c g
 Trichadenotecnum dactylinum Li, Fasheng, 2002 c g
 Trichadenotecnum danieli Yoshizawa & Lienhard, 2007 c g
 Trichadenotecnum decui Badonnel, 1987 c g
 Trichadenotecnum denticulatum Yoshizawa, Garcia Aldrete & Mockford, 2008 c g
 Trichadenotecnum depitarense Yoshizawa & Lienhard, 2007 c g
 Trichadenotecnum desolatum (Chapman, 1930) i c g
 Trichadenotecnum digitatum Li, Fasheng, 2002 c g
 Trichadenotecnum diplodurum Li, Fasheng, 2002 c g
 Trichadenotecnum distinctum Datta, 1969 c g
 Trichadenotecnum dobhanense New, 1973 c g
 Trichadenotecnum dolabratum Li, Fasheng & Chikun Yang, 1987 c g
 Trichadenotecnum emeishanense Li, Fasheng, 2002 c g
 Trichadenotecnum endangae Yoshizawa & Lienhard, 2014 c g
 Trichadenotecnum enneagonum (Li, Fasheng, 2002) c g
 Trichadenotecnum ericium Yoshizawa, Garcia Aldrete & Mockford, 2008 c g
 Trichadenotecnum erwini Yoshizawa, Garcia Aldrete & Mockford, 2008 c g
 Trichadenotecnum falx Yoshizawa, 2001 c g
 Trichadenotecnum felix Thornton, 1961 c g
 Trichadenotecnum furcalingum Yoshizawa, 2001 c g
 Trichadenotecnum fuscipenne Yoshizawa, 2001 c g
 Trichadenotecnum galihi Endang, Thornton & New, 2002 c g
 Trichadenotecnum gallicum Lienhard, 1986 c g
 Trichadenotecnum germanicum Roesler, 1939 c g
 Trichadenotecnum germinatum Yoshizawa, 2003 c g
 Trichadenotecnum godavarense New, 1971 c g
 Trichadenotecnum gombakense New & S. S. Lee, 1992 c g
 Trichadenotecnum gonzalezi (Williner, 1945) c g
 Trichadenotecnum guandongicum Li, Fasheng, 1993 c g
 Trichadenotecnum guangxiicum (Li, Fasheng, 2002) c g
 Trichadenotecnum gutianum Li, Fasheng, 1995 c g
 Trichadenotecnum guttatum Yoshizawa, Garcia Aldrete & Mockford, 2008 c g
 Trichadenotecnum hammani Endang, Thornton & New, 2002 c g
 Trichadenotecnum hengshanicum (Li, Fasheng, 2002) c g
 Trichadenotecnum himalayense Li, Fasheng & Chikun Yang, 1987 c g
 Trichadenotecnum iani Yoshizawa & Lienhard, 2004 c g
 Trichadenotecnum ianobidens Yoshizawa & Lienhard, 2004 c g
 Trichadenotecnum imperatorium Li, Fasheng, 1989 c g
 Trichadenotecnum imrum New & Thornton, 1976 c g
 Trichadenotecnum incognitum Roesler, 1939 c g
 Trichadenotecnum innuptum Betz, 1983 i c g 
 Trichadenotecnum isocaulum Li, Fasheng, 2002 c g
 Trichadenotecnum isseii Yoshizawa & Lienhard, 2007 c g
 Trichadenotecnum jaculatorum Li, Fasheng, 2002 c g
 Trichadenotecnum jambiense Endang & New, 2005 c g
 Trichadenotecnum jinxiuense Li, Fasheng, 2002 c g
 Trichadenotecnum kalibiruense Endang & New, 2005 c g
 Trichadenotecnum kerinciense Endang & New, 2005 c g
 Trichadenotecnum kojimai Yoshizawa & Lienhard, 2014 c g
 Trichadenotecnum krucilense Endang, Thornton & New, 2002 c g
 Trichadenotecnum kumejimense Yoshizawa, 2001 c g
 Trichadenotecnum kunmingicum Li, Fasheng, 2002 c g
 Trichadenotecnum latebrachium Yoshizawa, 2001 c g
 Trichadenotecnum laticornutum Endang, Thornton & New, 2002 c g
 Trichadenotecnum latipenne Yoshizawa, Garcia Aldrete & Mockford, 2008 c g
 Trichadenotecnum longilingum Yoshizawa, Garcia Aldrete & Mockford, 2008 c g
 Trichadenotecnum longimucronatum (Li, Fasheng, 1997) c g
 Trichadenotecnum longivalvum Li, Fasheng, 2005 c g
 Trichadenotecnum maculatum Yoshizawa, Garcia Aldrete & Mockford, 2008 c g
 Trichadenotecnum magnolingum Yoshizawa, Garcia Aldrete & Mockford, 2008 c g
 Trichadenotecnum magnomixtum Yoshizawa, 2001 c g
 Trichadenotecnum majus (Kolbe, 1880) i c g b
 Trichadenotecnum malayense New, 1975 c g
 Trichadenotecnum malickyi Yoshizawa & Lienhard, 2007 c g
 Trichadenotecnum mamillatum Li, Fasheng, 2002 c g
 Trichadenotecnum marginatum New & Thornton, 1976 c g
 Trichadenotecnum maroccanum Baz, 1989 c g
 Trichadenotecnum masoni New, 1971 c g
 Trichadenotecnum mclachlani New, 1973 c g
 Trichadenotecnum medium Thornton, 1961 c g
 Trichadenotecnum merum Betz, 1983 i c g b 
 Trichadenotecnum miffy Yoshizawa, Garcia Aldrete & Mockford, 2008 c g
 Trichadenotecnum minisexmaculatum Li, Fasheng & Chikun Yang, 1987 c g
 Trichadenotecnum minutum Enderlein, 1926 c g
 Trichadenotecnum mixtum Yoshizawa, 2001 c g
 Trichadenotecnum monodactylinum Li, Fasheng, 2001 c g
 Trichadenotecnum muaraense Endang & New, 2005 c g
 Trichadenotecnum multangulare (Li, Fasheng, 2002) c g
 Trichadenotecnum multicuspidatum Li, Fasheng, 2002 c g
 Trichadenotecnum nebulosum Vaughan, Thornton & New, 1991 c g
 Trichadenotecnum neoleonense Yoshizawa, Garcia Aldrete & Mockford, 2008 c g
 Trichadenotecnum nepalense Yoshizawa & Lienhard, 2007 c g
 Trichadenotecnum nicaraguense Yoshizawa, Garcia Aldrete & Mockford, 2008 c g
 Trichadenotecnum nothoapertum Yoshizawa, 2001 c g
 Trichadenotecnum oaxacense Yoshizawa, Garcia Aldrete & Mockford, 2008 c g
 Trichadenotecnum obliquidens Li, Fasheng, 2001 c g
 Trichadenotecnum obrienorum Yoshizawa, Garcia Aldrete & Mockford, 2008 c g
 Trichadenotecnum obsitum (Enderlein, 1908) c g
 Trichadenotecnum obsubulatum Li, Fasheng, 2002 c g
 Trichadenotecnum octogonum (Li, Fasheng, 2002) c g
 Trichadenotecnum okinawense Yoshizawa, 2001 c g
 Trichadenotecnum opiparipardale (Li, Fasheng, 1995) c g
 Trichadenotecnum paradika Endang & New, 2005 c g
 Trichadenotecnum pardidum Thornton, 1961 c g
 Trichadenotecnum pardoides Badonnel, 1955 c g
 Trichadenotecnum pardus Badonnel, 1955 i c g
 Trichadenotecnum paululum Li, Fasheng, 2002 c g
 Trichadenotecnum perbellum (Li, Fasheng, 2002) c g
 Trichadenotecnum percussum Li, Fasheng, 2002 c g
 Trichadenotecnum pergracilum Li, Fasheng, 2002 c g
 Trichadenotecnum periphericum Li, Fasheng, 2001 c g
 Trichadenotecnum peruense Yoshizawa, Garcia Aldrete & Mockford, 2008 c g
 Trichadenotecnum pichincha New & Thornton, 1975 c g
 Trichadenotecnum pictipenne Badonnel, 1973 c g
 Trichadenotecnum pokhariense New, 1983 c g
 Trichadenotecnum proctum Endang & New, 2005 c g
 Trichadenotecnum pseudomedium Yoshizawa, 2001 c g
 Trichadenotecnum punctipenne New, 1972 c g
 Trichadenotecnum pycnacanthum Li, Fasheng, 2002 c g
 Trichadenotecnum qingshuicum Li, Fasheng, 2002 c g
 Trichadenotecnum quadrispinosum Endang, Thornton & New, 2002 c g
 Trichadenotecnum quadruplex Li, Fasheng, 2002 c g
 Trichadenotecnum quaesitellum Yoshizawa, Garcia Aldrete & Mockford, 2008 c g
 Trichadenotecnum quaesitum (Chapman, 1930) i c g b
 Trichadenotecnum quinarium (Li, Fasheng, 2002) c g
 Trichadenotecnum rachimi Endang & Thornton, 1992 c g
 Trichadenotecnum rectangulum Li, Fasheng, 1992 c g
 Trichadenotecnum resupinum (Li, Fasheng, 1997) c
 Trichadenotecnum rhomboides Li, Fasheng, 2002 c g
 Trichadenotecnum roesleri New, 1972 c g
 Trichadenotecnum sabahense Yoshizawa & Lienhard, 2015 c g
 Trichadenotecnum santosai Endang & Thornton, 1992 c g
 Trichadenotecnum sclerotum New, 1978 c g
 Trichadenotecnum scoparium (Li, Fasheng, 1995) c
 Trichadenotecnum scrobiculare Li, Fasheng, 1992 c g
 Trichadenotecnum sexpunctatum (Linnaeus, 1758) c g
 Trichadenotecnum sexpunctellum (Enderlein, 1907) c g
 Trichadenotecnum sharkeyi Yoshizawa & Lienhard, 2015 c g
 Trichadenotecnum shawi Yoshizawa & Garcia Aldrete, 2010 c g
 Trichadenotecnum shilinicum (Li, Fasheng, 2002) c g
 Trichadenotecnum sibolangitense Endang & New, 2005 c g
 Trichadenotecnum simile Mockford, 1996 c g
 Trichadenotecnum sinuatum New, 1972 c g
 Trichadenotecnum slossonae (Banks, 1903) i c g b
 Trichadenotecnum soekarmanni Endang, Thornton & New, 2002 c g
 Trichadenotecnum soenarti Endang, Thornton & New, 2002 c g
 Trichadenotecnum sparsum Yoshizawa, Garcia Aldrete & Mockford, 2008 c g
 Trichadenotecnum spiniserrulum Datta, 1969 c g
 Trichadenotecnum spuristipiatum Li, Fasheng, 1997 c g
 Trichadenotecnum stipiatum Li, Fasheng, 1992 c g
 Trichadenotecnum stipulatum Li, Fasheng, 2002 c g
 Trichadenotecnum subrotundum Li, Fasheng, 2001 c g
 Trichadenotecnum subscalare Li, Fasheng, 2002 c g
 Trichadenotecnum sufflatum Li, Fasheng, 1993 c g
 Trichadenotecnum sumatrense Endang & New, 2005 c g
 Trichadenotecnum suwai Yoshizawa & Lienhard, 2007 c g
 Trichadenotecnum sylvaticum Turner, B. D., 1975 c g
 Trichadenotecnum takahashii Yoshizawa, 2001 c g
 Trichadenotecnum tambopatense Yoshizawa, Garcia Aldrete & Mockford, 2008 c g
 Trichadenotecnum tenuispinum Li, Fasheng, 1995 c g
 Trichadenotecnum thallodialum Li, Fasheng, 2002 c g
 Trichadenotecnum thorntoni New, 1975 c g
 Trichadenotecnum tigrinum Yoshizawa & Lienhard, 2015 c g
 Trichadenotecnum trichotomum Li, Fasheng, 2002 c g
 Trichadenotecnum trigonophyllum Li, Fasheng, 1993 c g
 Trichadenotecnum trigonosceneum (Enderlein, 1911) c g
 Trichadenotecnum tuitense Yoshizawa, Garcia Aldrete & Mockford, 2008 c g
 Trichadenotecnum turriforme (Li, Fasheng, 1995) c g
 Trichadenotecnum unciforme (Li, Fasheng, 2002) c g
 Trichadenotecnum uncorne (Li, Fasheng, 1995) c g
 Trichadenotecnum uniforme Li, Fasheng, 2002 c g
 Trichadenotecnum univittatum Li, Fasheng, 2002 c g
 Trichadenotecnum vaughani Endang, Thornton & New, 2002 c g
 Trichadenotecnum waykambasense Endang & New, 2005 c g
 Trichadenotecnum waykananense Endang & New, 2005 c g
 Trichadenotecnum wuxiacum Li, Fasheng, 1997 c g
 Trichadenotecnum xizangicum Li, Fasheng, 2002 c g
 Trichadenotecnum yaeyamense Yoshizawa, 2001 c g
 Trichadenotecnum yamatomajus Yoshizawa, 2001 c g
 Trichadenotecnum yatai Yoshizawa & Lienhard, 2014 c g
 Trichadenotecnum yonaguniense Yoshizawa, 2001 c g

Data sources: i = ITIS, c = Catalogue of Life, g = GBIF, b = Bugguide.net

References

Trichadenotecnum